Mike Sudi Abdallah (born 5 January 2000) is a Burundian footballer who plays as a striker for Malaysia Super League club Kuching City and the Burundi national team.

Club career

In 2020, Abdallah signed for Rwandan side AS Kigali. In 2021, he signed for Al-Faisaly (Amman) in Jordan. In 2022. he signed for Bangladeshi club Muktijoddha Sangsad KC.

Sudi also signed for Bashundhara Kings, on loan from Muktijoddha, to play in 2022 AFC Cup. However, he didn’t make any appearance as he couldn’t reach the host country due to visa issues and his team Bashundhara eliminated from group stage. He returned to Muktijoddha after finishing the tournament within a month.

References

External links
 

2000 births
Al-Faisaly SC players
AS Kigali FC players
Association football forwards
Bangladesh Football Premier League players
Burundi international footballers
Burundi Premier League players
Burundian expatriate footballers
Burundian expatriate sportspeople in Rwanda
Burundian footballers
Expatriate footballers in Bangladesh
Expatriate footballers in Jordan
Expatriate footballers in Rwanda
Jordanian Pro League players
Living people
Muktijoddha Sangsad KC players
Rwanda National Football League players